Fry v Lane (1888) 40 ChD 312 is an English contract law case relating to exploitation of weakness, allowing escape from a contract.

Facts
JB and George Fry worked as a plumber and laundryman, earning £1 a week. But they had the reversion of their Uncle's estate, subject to the life tenancy of their Aunt. They sold it in 1878 to Mr Lane for £170 and £270 respectively. They were advised by an inexperienced solicitor who also acted for Mr Lane. When the Aunt died in 1886, the interests were each worth £730, and in 1878 it would have been £475.

Judgment
Kay J cited Evans v Llewellin and Haygarth v Wearing saying equity most commonly interferes in favour of an expectant heir, in his youth, or ‘a poor man with imperfect education’. Where such circumstances are shown the onus is on the purchaser to show it was ‘fair, just and reasonable’ (Lord Selborne LC, Aylesford). The undervalue was ‘so gross as to amount of itself to evidence of fraud.’

See also

English contract law
Iniquitous pressure in English law
Lloyds Bank Ltd v Bundy [1975] QB 326
Williams v. Walker-Thomas Furniture Co. 350 F.2d 445 (C.A. D.C. 1965)

Notes

References

English unconscionability case law
1888 in British law
1888 in case law